The Party of Rights was a Croatian nationalist political party in Kingdom of Croatia-Slavonia and later in Kingdom of Serbs, Croats and Slovenes.

It was founded in 1861 by Ante Starčević and Eugen Kvaternik, two influential nationalist politicians who advocated for greater Croatian autonomy and later for the independence of the Croatian state. Moderate and hardline nationalist factions existed during the period and after Starčević's death, the party would embrace anti-Serb, anti-Yugoslav and Republicanist leadership. In 1929, the party was dissolved after the proclamation of the 6 January Dictatorship and soon after, some members joined the underground organization Ustaše which was led by Ante Pavelić. After the dissolution of Yugoslavia, numerous Croatian and Bosnian Croat political parties claim the lineage from the party itself.

Kingdom of Croatia

The Party of Rights was founded on 26 June 1861 when Ante Starčević and Eugen Kvaternik first presented the policies of the "Party of Rights" to the Croatian Parliament. They called for greater Croatian autonomy and self-rule at a time when Croatia was divided into several crownlands within the Habsburg Monarchy.

In early October 1871, Kvaternik and several other party members disavowed the official party position, which advocated a political solution, and instead launched the Rakovica revolt. The rebels declared the following aims:
 freedom of the Croatian people from Austrian and Magyar (Hungarian) oppression
 proclamation of an independent Croatia
 equality under law
 municipal self-government
 abolition of the Military Frontier and introduction of free counties
 respect for both religions in love and unity
The rebels also sought to encourage participation of Orthodox Serbs in the revolt, and some of them did, but the uprising was soon crushed by the authorities. Most of the rebels were killed, including Kvaternik.

The party ran in the 1883 Croatian parliamentary by-election and the 1884 Croatian parliamentary election. In the late 19th and early 20th centuries, the party underwent various changes in membership and policy, as different factions splintered and reconciled over time.
These factions often clashed over who best represented Croatian state rights.

During the 1895 visit of Emperor Franz Joseph to Zagreb, a flag-burning incident happened, that was disavowed by the party leader Fran Folnegović. However, Ante Starčević disagreed, and he and his followers, notably Eugen Kumičić and Josip Frank (a Jewish convert to Catholicism), formed the first Pure Party of Rights. Starčević died in 1896, and was succeeded by Josip Frank under whose leadership the party became fixated on anti-Serb sentiment.

In the 1897 Croatian parliamentary election, both parties ran. In 1902, the two Parties reconciled; however, in 1905 the leadership of the party, led by Frano Supilo, merged into the Croat-Serb Coalition, and the Pure Party of Rights was formed once again. Starčević's Party of Rights participated in the 1908 Croatian parliamentary election. The next year, in 1909, the Pure Party of Rights itself splintered, as Mile Starčević, Ante Pavelić and others accused Frank of consorting with Pavao Rauch. The dissidents formed Starčević's Party of Rights. Both the Starčević and the Frank Party of Rights participated in the 1910 Croatian parliamentary election. In 1911, Frank died, and the two factions merged into the latter. Both Parties participated in the 1913 Croatian parliamentary election.

Kingdom of Dalmatia
The Party of Rights also operated in Dalmatia, which was separated from Croatia and Slavonia at the time. They participated in the Dalmatian elections in 1895, 1901 and 1908.

After World War I

The Croatian Party of Rights welcomed the dissolution of Austria-Hungary in the wake of World War I as a means toward achieving Croatian independence, through the creation of the State of Slovenes, Croats and Serbs. In October 1918, Party of Rights announced their dismissal. However, just one month later, party's activity was renewed when the Business Committee of the Party held a session on 28 November 1918, announcing the renewal of party's activity and their goal to save national and state individuality. When the State of Slovenes, Croats and Serbs proclaimed its unification with Kingdom of Serbia on 1 December 1918, Party of Rights organized a protest. On 1 March 1919, the same day the Temporary National Representation met without them present, the Party of Rights changed its name to Croatian Party of Rights.

In their program from March 1919, members of the party made a plea for Croatian independence based on the right to self-determination of all peoples. In this program, the Party of Rights emphasized their republicanism as opposed to the monarchism of House of Karađorđević, whose rule was accepted by all Croatian politicians, except Stjepan Radić's Croatian Peasant Party. Their main goal were the ideas of Ante Starčević for an independent Croatian state, and the "Croatian State Right" was their main argument for achieving this goal. According to the concept of the "Croatian State Right", they expressed a need for unification of all Croat lands, including Bosnia and Herzegovina. The program was signed by President of the Party of Rights, dr. Vladimir Prebeg and Secretary of the Party, Ante Pavelić.

Between 1919 and 1920, a revolutionary organization called the Croatian Committee gathered members of the Party of Rights known as the Frankists.

A unified Party of Rights participated in the 1920 Kingdom of Serbs, Croats and Slovenes Constitutional Assembly election. The Croatian politics at the time started to be dominated by the Croatian Peasant Party, but in 1921, the Croatian parties started to form the Croatian National Representation (Croatian Bloc) that included the Party of Rights. Stjepan Radić and other coalition leaders ejected the Party of Rights from the coalition by the end of 1922.

The Party of Rights ran standalone in the 1923 Kingdom of Serbs, Croats and Slovenes parliamentary election. It did not enter the 1925 Kingdom of Serbs, Croats and Slovenes parliamentary election, but did join the Bloc again the same year. The Party of Rights cooperated with Stjepan Radić as part of the Croatian Bloc, composed of the Croatian Republican Peasant Party, Croatian Union and the Party of Rights.

The Party of Rights alone was unable to influence the majority of Croats, as their main supporters were a small number of middle class citizens, the majority of whom lived in Zagreb, while Stjepan Radić dominated among Croats elsewhere. Within this bloc, Party of Rights opposed Serbian nationalist hegemony and centralism. Sometimes they objected to Radić's readiness to come to an understanding with the Serbian side. The main vehicle of the Party of Rights was the concept of the Croatian Right, which made the idea of Yugoslavism unsustainable, assessing it as misconception and the main obstacle to Croatian independence.

Nevertheless, the leaders of the Party of Rights had established contacts with the People's Radical Party in Belgrade and occasionally fought for their own particular interests. In 1924–25, this controversial relationship became public, particularly as the party's then-vice-president Mirko Košutić publicly accused the rest of the party leadership of colluding with the government of Nikola Pašić against the interests of the Croatian Bloc.

In 1929, the king of Yugoslavia instituted the January 6th Dictatorship. He banned all political parties, and the militant wing of the Party of Rights went underground to organize the Ustaše movement, led by former party secretary Ante Pavelić, whose wing of the party was the most staunchly anti-Serb.

Legacy
The eponymous Croatian Party of Rights, founded in 1990, claims lineage from the original Party of Rights. Since 1990, several splinter parties have been founded that claim the same:
 Croatian Pure Party of Rights,
 Croatian Party of Rights 1861,
 Autochthonous Croatian Party of Rights,
Croatian Party of Rights Dr. Ante Starčević,
 Croatian Party of Rights of Bosnia and Herzegovina,
 Party of Croatian Right,
 Party of Rights of Bosnia and Herzegovina 1861

References

Bibliography
 

Political parties established in 1861
Political parties disestablished in 1929
Political parties in Austria-Hungary
Defunct political parties in Croatia
Political parties in the Kingdom of Yugoslavia
Anti-Serbian sentiment
1861 establishments in the Austrian Empire
Ethnic organizations based in Austria-Hungary
Croat political organizations
Ethnic organizations based in Yugoslavia
Right-wing parties in Europe
Croatian nationalist parties
Yugoslav Croatia
Croatian irredentism